Benjamin Ndubuisi Eze (born February 8, 1981) is a Nigerian-Italian former professional basketball player. He is a 2.08 m (6 ft 10 in) tall center.

Professional career
Eze was brought from Nigeria to Russia during the 1998-99 season, where he played in 1 game with Avtodor Saratov. After leaving Russia, Eze moved to the United States and signed to play with the University of Louisville Cardinals. However, Eze was declared ineligible because of the game in Russia for the 1999-00 basketball year. He then transferred to the College of Southern Idaho junior college, where he averaged 7.5 points and 5.2 rebounds per game. He declared himself eligible for the 2001 NBA Draft but went undrafted.

In 2011, he signed with Olimpia Milano. On February 6, 2014, he signed with Dinamo Sassari.

Nigerian national team
Eze represented Nigeria at the 2005 FIBA Africa Championship, where Nigeria finished in third place, qualifying for the 2006 FIBA World Championship. Eze did not join the Nigerian team at the World Championship.

References

External links
 Euroleague.net Profile
 Eurobasket.com Profile
 NBA.com Draft Profile

1981 births
Living people
BC Avtodor Saratov players
BC Khimki players
Centers (basketball)
Dinamo Sassari players
Italian men's basketball players
KD Slovan players
Lega Basket Serie A players
Mens Sana Basket players
Nigerian expatriate basketball people in Italy
Nigerian expatriate basketball people in the United States
Nigerian expatriates in Russia
Nigerian men's basketball players
Olimpia Milano players
Power forwards (basketball)
Southern Idaho Golden Eagles men's basketball players
Viola Reggio Calabria players